The 1st Infantry Division Dacica was one of the major units of the Romanian Land Forces, with its headquarters located in Bucharest. It was the heraldic successor of the Romanian First Army. On 31 August 2015, 1st Infantry Division headquarters disbanded, to become, three months later, the Headquarters Multinational Division Southeast of NATO's Allied Joint Force Command Naples.

History
The First Army was one of the major units of the Romanian military in both World War I, partaking in such operations as the Romanian offensive in Transylvania in 1916 and the Battle of Mărăşeşti in 1917, and World War II, seeing action on the Eastern Front, particularly after the 23 August 1944 Coup, when the First Army fought westwards alongside Soviet units in battles such as that of Debrecen, Budapest and going as far as Prague. Following the end of the war, the First Army was disbanded on 2 June 1947, with the units under its command being transferred to one of the four newly formed Military Regions. This reorganization process was applied to all Romanian armies.

On 5 April 1980, the First Army was reestablished and headquartered in Bucharest, after being assigned units previously under the control of the 2nd Army Command. The latter was relocated to Buzău. Dan Ghica-Radu was the intelligence office chief from 1998 until 2000. On the 1st of August 2000, the First Army was restructured, becoming the 1st Territorial Army Corps "General Ioan Culcer", as part of a wider program to bring the Romanian military in line with NATO standards.
On 15 August 2008, as a continuation of the reorganization process of the Romanian Land Forces, the 1st Territorial Army Corps "General Ioan Culcer" was reformed as the 1st Infantry Division, receiving the name "Dacica", and becoming the heraldic successor of the First Army. Units of the 1st Infantry Division were deployed (or deployed at some point) in various theaters of operation around the world, such as Bosnia, Kosovo, Iraq and Afghanistan. In 2015 the Division was removed from the Romanian Army's order of battle and was transferred to NATO command; forming the framework for what would become Headquarters Multinational Division Southeast coming under the command of NATO's Allied Joint Force Command Naples.

Former structure
 1st Infantry Division Dacica – HQ Bucharest
1st Mechanized Brigade "Argedava" - headquartered at Bucharest
  2nd Infantry Battalion "Călugăreni" ("Desert Tigers") - Bucharest
 495th Infantry Battalion - Clinceni
 114th Tank Battalion"”- Târgoviște
 113th Artillery Battalion - Slobozia
  288th Anti-aircraft Artillery Battalion - Focşani
 117th Logistics Battalion - Ploiești
2nd Infantry Brigade "Rovine" - headquartered at Craiova
 20th Infantry Battalion "Black Scorpions" - Craiova
 22nd Infantry Battalion - Craiova
  26th Infantry Battalion "Neagoe Basarab" ("Red Scorpions") - Craiova
 325th Artillery Battalion  - Caracal
 116th Logistics Battalion "Golden Scorpions" - Craiova
 205th Anti-aircraft Artillery Battalion "Blue Scorpions" - Craiova
2nd Mountain Troops Brigade "Sarmizegetusa" - headquartered at Braşov
 21st Mountain Troops Battalion - Predeal
 30th Mountain TroopsBattalion -  Câmpulung
 33rd Mountain Troops Battalion - Curtea de Argeş
 206th Mixed Artillery Battalion - Braşov
 228th Anti-aircraft Missile Battalion - Braşov
 229th Logistic Battalion - Braşov
2nd Logistics Base "Valahia" - headquartered at Târgoviște
51st Mixed Artillery Regiment "General Cornel Paraniac" - headquartered at Slobozia
61st Mixed Anti-aircraft Missiles Regiment "Pelendava" - headquartered at Slobozia
  1st "CIMIC" Battalion - headquartered at Bucharest
 49th CBRN Battalion "Argeş" - headquartered at Piteşti
 96th Engineer Battalion "Joseph Kruzel"
 313th Reconnaissance Battalion "Burebista"
 45th Communications & Information Systems Battalion "Căpitan Grigore Giosanu"
 300th Logistic Support Battalion "Sarmis"''' - headquartered at Bucharest
 other supporting units

See also 
 Romania during World War I
 Romania during World War II
 Battle of Romania (1944)

References

External links
 Official website

1